The Casa de Moneda de la República Argentina is the Argentine mint, controlled by the Argentine government and administratively subordinated to the Ministry of Economy. A mint was established in 1779, before Argentina became independent.  Law 733 of 1875 ordered the creation of two mints, one in Buenos Aires and another in Salta; the Casa de Moneda in Buenos Aires was opened on 14 February 1881, with ingeniero (engineer) Castilla as director and John Joseph Jolly Kyle as chief chemist.

It produces legal tender coins and banknotes. It also produces medals and security prints (i.e., passports, subway tokens, postage stamps) that are used and issued by government-run service providers. The present currency printed is the Argentine peso, since 1992.

In 1927 the Casa de Moneda Museum was inaugurated, with historical banknotes, coins, postal and other stamps, seals, medals, and others.

References

External links

 

1779 establishments in South America
Argentina
Argentina
Manufacturing companies based in Buenos Aires
Finance in Argentina
Currencies of Argentina
Philately of Argentina
Museums in Buenos Aires
Numismatic museums in South America